The 2017–18 EFL Trophy, known as the Checkatrade Trophy for sponsorship reasons, was the 35th season in the history of the competition, a knock-out tournament for English football clubs in League One and League Two of the English football system, and also including 16 Premier League and Championship "B teams" with Category One status after the previous season's trial format was extended.

Following the new format introduced in 2016–17, 64 teams entered the competition, including first time entries from the academy teams of Manchester City, Newcastle United and Tottenham Hotspur, who all declined to enter in the previous season.  Coventry City were the reigning champions, but were eliminated in the group stage on 7 November.

Participating clubs
48 clubs from League One and League Two.
16 invited Category One Academy teams.
Category One teams relegated to League One missed out on having academies participate in the following tournament.

Notes
Arsenal, Liverpool and Manchester United declined to participate.

Eligibility criteria for players
For EFL clubs;  a minimum of 5 'First Team' players in the starting 11 as defined under the competition's existing rules.
For invited clubs – 6 of the starting 11 to be U21 (as at 30 June 2016).

Competition format

Group stage

 Sixteen groups of 4 teams will be organised on a regionalised basis.
 All groups will include one invited club.
 All clubs will play each other once, either home or away (Academies play all group matches away from home).
 Clubs will be awarded 3 points for a win and 1 point for a draw.
 In the event of a drawn game (after 90 minutes), a penalty shootout will be held with the winning team earning an additional point.
 The top two teams will progress to the Knockout Stage.

Northern Section

Group A

Group B

Group C

Group D

Group E

Group F

Group G

Group H

Southern Section

Group A

Group B

Group C

Group D

Group E

Group F

Group G

Group H

Knockout stage

If scores are level after 90 minutes in Rounds 2, 3 and 4, the game will be determined by the taking of penalties.

Round 2
The Round 2 draw was made on 10 November 2017. The 32 remaining teams were drawn into 16 ties; each group winner will be at home to a runner-up from a different group within their own region.

Northern Section

Southern Section

Round 3

The Round 3 draw was made on 8 December 2017.

Northern Section

Southern Section

Round 4
Eight teams participated in this round with ties originally scheduled to take place in the week commencing 22 January 2018.

Semi-finals
Four teams participated in this round, which consisted of single ties played at the stadium of the club drawn first in each tie.

Final

Match proceeds
After deduction of match expenses, all proceeds were split:
45% Home club
45% Away club
10% to the pool account

Top goalscorers

Notes

References

External links

EFL Trophy
EFL Trophy
Trophy